The 1996 Florida State Seminoles football team represented Florida State University in the 1996 NCAA Division I-A football season. The team was coached by Bobby Bowden and played their home games at Doak Campbell Stadium. The team was selected national champion by Alderson.

Florida State completed just their third undefeated regular season, and for the second straight season, running back Warrick Dunn was a Heisman Trophy finalist.

Schedule

Roster

Rankings

1997 NFL Draft
The following Seminoles were selected in the 1997 NFL Draft, including four players taken in the first fourteen picks.

References

Florida State
Florida State Seminoles football seasons
Atlantic Coast Conference football champion seasons
Florida State Seminoles football